Saint-Claude is a commune in the French overseas department of Guadeloupe. It lies in the interior of southern Basse-Terre Island, just northeast of the capital city of Basse-Terre.

Population

Education
Public preschools and primary schools include:
 Ecole primaire Bourg 2 St-claude
 Ecole primaire Louis Chalcol
 Ecole primaire Félix Laban
 Ecole maternelle Nelson Rose
 Ecole maternelle Arlette Salomon

Public junior high schools include:
 Collège Rémy Nainsouta

Public senior high schools include:
 LDM du commerce, des services et de l'artisanat Ducharmoy

Private primary schools include:
 Ecole primaire privée Saint Joseph de Cluny

Notable people
 

Raymond Guilliod (1919–2005), politician

See also
Communes of the Guadeloupe department

References

 
Communes of Guadeloupe